OUP is the Oxford University Press, a British publisher.

OUP may also refer to:

 Ohio University Press, an American publisher
 Official Unionist Party, a political party in Northern Ireland

See also
 OUP-16, a histamine agonist drug